Kanimanga is an Iranian war movie directed by Seifollah Dad . The film's second cinematic effects built in 1987 (1366 AH) and released longest in the history of Iranian cinema theater with 15 years

Awards 
(Fajr Film Festival) Kanimanga received the 2 Crystal Simorgh for Best Compilation (Ruhollah Emami) and best special effects (Mohammad Reza Shafaruddin) return.

In addition, nominated for best supporting actor Ali Sabetfar became a man.

Plot

See also
65th Airborne Special Forces Brigade

References

Persian-language films
Iranian war films
Iran–Iraq War films
Films set in Iraq
Chinese historical action films